Hüttenberg is a municipality in the Lahn-Dill-Kreis in Hesse, Germany.

Geography

Location
Hüttenberg lies about 6 km southeast of Wetzlar and 10 km southwest of Giessen south of the river Lahn.

Neighbouring communities
Hüttenberg borders in the west on the community of Schöffengrund, in the north on the town of Wetzlar (both in the Lahn-Dill-Kreis) and the town of Giessen, in the northeast on the town of Linden, and in the east and south on the community of Langgöns (both in Giessen district).

Constituent communities
The community consists of the centres of Hüttenberg (earlier Hochelheim and Hörnsheim), Rechtenbach, Reiskirchen, Vollnkirchen, Volpertshausen
and Weidenhausen.

History
On 1 August 1968, Groß-Rechtenbach and Klein-Rechtenbach formed the new community of Rechtenbach, while Hochelheim and Hörnsheim formed the new community of Hüttenberg. On 1 January 1971, Rechtenbach, Vollnkirchen and Weidenhausen merged into the new community of Schwingbach. On 1 January 1977, the new greater community of Hüttenberg was formed out of Hüttenberg, Reiskirchen, Schwingbach and Volpertshausen.
 
In the years from 1910, Paul Schneider spent his youth in Hochelheim. He was later Hochelheim's and Dornholzhausen's Evangelical minister from 1926 to 1934. In 1939, he was murdered by the Nazis in Buchenwald concentration camp. A street and an Evangelical parish house in Hüttenberg are named after him. After the Second World War, many people driven out of the Sudetenland came here and contributed considerably to the community's economic growth, its cultural modernization and to changes in the community.

Hüttenberg has become well known for team handball and the community's gustatory speciality, Handkäse (literally "hand cheese", so called from its originally being shaped by hand), a pungent, sour-milk cheese. It is still produced in Hüttenberg today and sold all over Germany.

Moreover, Hüttenberg is somewhat less well known – and somewhat more laid back as a result – for being a small recreation destination in the Taunus foothills with lovely forests, hilly fields, brookside paths and rare kinds of plants. On some farms there are tasty treats. In summer, country parties and many traditional festivals take place around Hüttenberg.

Politics

Municipal council

The municipal elections on 27 March 2011 yielded the following results:

Note: The FÖBH (Free Ecological Citizens List of Hüttenberg) is a citizens' coalition politically close to the Greens.

Partnerships
Hüttenberg maintains partnerships with the following places:
  the market community of Göstling an der Ybbs, Lower Austria since 1991,
  Oberschönau, Thuringia since 1992
  the French community of Crémieu east of Lyon, since 1993.

Personalities

Horst Spengler, handball world champion of 1978.
Samuel Harfst, musician

References

External links
Hüttenberg

Lahn-Dill-Kreis